The 2019–20 Taça de Portugal (also known as Taça de Portugal Placard for sponsorship reasons) was the 80th edition of the Taça de Portugal, the premier knockout competition in Portuguese football. 
A total of 144 clubs entered this edition, including teams from the top three tiers of the Portuguese football league system and representatives of the fourth-tier District leagues and cups. This was the first season to allow a fourth substitution during extra time.

The competition began on 1 September 2019 with the first-round matches and was scheduled to conclude on 24 May 2020 with the final at the Estádio Nacional in Oeiras, between top-tier sides Benfica and Porto. However, due to the COVID-19 pandemic in Portugal, the final was postponed to 1 August 2020 and was played instead at the Estádio Cidade de Coimbra in Coimbra, behind closed doors. 
Porto beat Benfica 2–1 to win their 17th title in the competition and secure the club's eighth double. 

Primeira Liga side Sporting CP were the defending champions, but they were eliminated by third-tier side Alverca in the third round.

Format

Teams 
A total of 144 teams will compete in the 2019–20 Taça de Portugal: 18 teams from Primeira Liga, 16 teams from the LigaPro, 68 teams from the Campeonato de Portugal and 42 teams from the District championships and cups.

Primeira Liga 

 Belenenses SAD
 Benfica
 Braga
 Moreirense
 Porto
 Rio Ave
 Sporting CP
 Vitória de Guimarães
 Paços de Ferreira

 Famalicão
 Gil Vicente
 Aves
 Marítimo
 Santa Clara
 Portimonense
 Boavista
 Vitória de Setúbal
 Tondela

LigaPro 

 Académica
 Académico de Viseu
 Casa Pia
 Chaves
 Cova da Piedade
 Estoril
 Farense
 Feirense

 Leixões
 Mafra
 Nacional
 Oliveirense
 Penafiel
 Sp. Covilhã
 Varzim
 Vilafranquense

Campeonato de Portugal 

Series A
 AD Oliveirense
 Berço
 Bragança
 Câmara de Lobos
 Cerveira
 Fafe
 Maria da Fonte
 Merelinense
 Mirandela
 Montalegre
 Pedras Salgadas
 São Martinho
 União da Madeira
 Vizela

Series B
 Amarante
 Arouca
 Canelas 2010
 Castro Daire
 Coimbrões
 Espinho
 Felgueiras 1932
 Ginásio Figueirense
 Gondomar
 Leça
 Lusitânia Lourosa
 Lusitano Vildemoinhos
 Paredes
 Pedras Rubras
 Sanjoanense
 Trofense
 Valadares Gaia
 Vila Real

Series C
 Águeda
 Anadia
 Beira-Mar
 Benfica Castelo Branco
 Caldas
 Condeixa
 Fátima
 Fontinhas
 Ideal
 Marinhense
 Oleiros
 Oliveira do Hospital
 Praiense
 Sertanense
 Torreense
 União de Leiria
 União de Santarém
 Vitória de Sernache

Series D
 1º de Dezembro
 Alverca
 Aljustrelense
 Amora
 Armacenenses
 Esperança de Lagos
 Fabril Barreiro
 Louletano
 Loures
 Lusitano de Évora
 Olhanense
 Olímpico Montijo
 Oriental
 Pinhalnovense
 Real
 Sacavenense
 Sintra Football
 Sintrense

District Championships 

Algarve FA
 Moncarapachense (1st)
 Ferreiras (CW)
Angra do Heroísmo FA
 Velense (2nd)
 Lusitânia dos Açores (3rd)
Aveiro FA
 Bustelo (2nd)
 São João de Ver (CW)
Beja FA
 Penedo Gordo (2nd)
 Praia Milfontes (CW)
Braga FA
 Prado (2nd)
 Pevidém (CW)
Bragança FA
 Carção (2nd)
 Rebordelo (CR)

Castelo Branco FA
 Vila Velha de Ródão (3rd)
 Águias do Moradal (CR)
Coimbra FA
 Ançã (3rd)
 Pampilhosense (4th)
Évora FA
 Estrela Vendas Novas (2nd)
 Juventude Évora (CW)
Guarda FA
 Manteigas (2nd)
 Vila Cortês (CW)
Horta FA
 Fayal (1st)
Leiria FA
 G.R. Amigos da Paz (2nd)
 Portomosense (3rd)

Lisbon FA
 Pêro Pinheiro (CW)
 Coutada (CR)
Madeira FA
 Porto da Cruz (CW)
Ponta Delgada FA
 São Roque (1st)
 Rabo de Peixe (CR)
Portalegre FA
 Eléctrico (2nd)
 Crato (CR)
Porto FA
 Rebordosa (3rd)
 Vilarinho (CW)

Santarém FA
 Coruchense (2nd)
 União Almeirim (3rd)
Setúbal FA
 Alcochetense (2nd)
 Vasco da Gama Sines (3rd)
Viana do Castelo FA
 Atlético dos Arcos (2nd)
 Ponte da Barca (CR)
Vila Real FA
 Régua (2nd)
 Vila Pouca de Aguiar (CR)
Viseu FA
 Mortágua (2nd)
 Ferreira de Aves (CW)

Note: 1st/2nd/3rd/4th: final placing in championship; CW/CR: Cup winner or runner-up

Schedule 
All draws are held at the Portuguese Football Federation (FPF) headquarters in Oeiras. Match kick-off times are in WET (UTC±0) from the fourth round to the semi-finals, and in WEST (UTC+1) during the rest of the competition.

First round 
Times are WEST (UTC+1) (local times, if different, are in parentheses).

Second round 

Repechage
The following 21 first-round losing teams were selected to compete in the second round:

 Águias do Moradal (D)
 Anadia (D)
 Ançã (D)
 Atlético dos Arcos (D)
 Coruchense (D)
 Eléctrico (D)
 Fabril Barreiro (CP)
 Fontinhas (CP)
 Ideal (CP)
 Leça (CP)
 Loures (CP)
 Lusitânia dos Açores (D)
 Lusitano de Évora (CP)
 Marinhense (CP)
 Olímpico Montijo (CP)
 Pevidém (D)
 Prado (D)
 São João de Ver (D)
 Valadares Gaia (CP)
 Vasco da Gama Sines (D)
 Vila Pouca de Aguiar (D)

Fixtures
Times are WEST (UTC+1) (local times, if different, are in parentheses).

Third round 

Times are WEST (UTC+1).

Fourth round 

Times are WET (UTC±0).

Fifth round 

Times are WET (UTC±0).

Quarter-finals 

Times are WET (UTC±0).

Semi-finals 

Times are WET (UTC±0).

Porto won 4–1 on aggregate.

Benfica won 4–3 on aggregate.

Final 
The final was scheduled to take place on 24 May 2020 at the Estádio Nacional in Oeiras. However, on 10 March, the FPF announced that it would be postponed due to the coronavirus pandemic in Portugal, following the recommendations of the Portuguese government. On 28 April, Portuguese Prime Minister António Costa met with the presidents of the "Big Three" clubs in Portugal (Benfica, Sporting CP and Porto), the President of the FPF, and the President of the Liga Portuguesa de Futebol Profissional, to discuss the conditions of the return of football competitions in Portugal. Two days later, with the consent of the Ministry of Health, Costa approved the return of the final, with the match being played behind closed doors. 

On 2 July, it was announced that the final would be played on 1 August at the Estádio Cidade de Coimbra in Coimbra, behind closed doors.

Bracket

Notes

References

External links 
 
 Taça de Portugal 2019-2020 summary(SOCCERWAY)

2019–20
Portugal
2019–20 in Portuguese football
Association football events postponed due to the COVID-19 pandemic